Andrew Hastie (born 1983) is an Australian Member of Parliament and former army officer.

Andrew Hastie may also refer to:

 Andrew Hastie (field hockey) (born 1970), New Zealand field hockey player